Billy Leon Jenkins Jr. (born July 8, 1974 in Los Angeles, California) is a former professional American football defensive back in the National Football League. He played for the St. Louis Rams (1997–1999), the Denver Broncos (2000–2001), the Green Bay Packers (2001), and the Buffalo Bills (2002). He played in Super Bowl XXXIV for the Rams where he started at safety. After the 1999 season, the Rams traded Jenkins to the Denver Broncos for a fifth-round pick in the 2000 NFL Draft.  

He is an alumnus of Howard University. 
Jenkins is currently a defensive backs coach at his alma mater.

NFL stats

References

External links
NFL.com player page

1974 births
Living people
Players of American football from Los Angeles
American football safeties
Howard Bison football players
St. Louis Rams players
Denver Broncos players
Green Bay Packers players
Buffalo Bills players